Energia Group (formerly Viridian Group) is an Irish energy company with interests across the island of Ireland. From a consumer perspective, Energia Group organises itself into two main groups: Power NI and Energia.

Businesses
Energia Group's strategy is strongly focused on Irish energy markets. Its businesses are organised in two main groups: Power NI and Energia.

Power NI
Power NI supplies over 600,000 homes and businesses in Northern Ireland with electricity.

Power NI Power Procurement Business manages the group's power purchase agreements.

Power NI was the former customer supply business of Northern Ireland Electricity, known originally as NIE Supply and then after its separation from the rest of NIE, as NIE Energy. Both it and the Power Procurement Business "were separated from NIE on 1 November 2007 in accordance with the requirements of the 2003 EU Electricity Directive which required the independence of the distribution system operation function." In 2010 Viridian sold Northern Ireland Electricity, including the NIE name, to the Electricity Supply Board - the state-owned electricity company of Ireland. As a result, NIE Energy was no longer allowed to use the NIE name, and it rebranded as Power NI on 25 July 2011.

Energia
Energia was founded in 1999 and became the first independent supplier in Northern Ireland. Within a year it had entered the Irish business electricity market. By 2003, Energia had established itself as Ireland's leading independent energy business supplying over 30% of large industrial electricity requirements. Energia now supplies over 250,000 homes in the Republic of Ireland.

Energia Renewables and Flexible Generation
Energia Flexible Generation generates electricity through Huntstown power station, whilst Energia Renewables generates via wind power across the island of Ireland.

History
Energia Group (formerly Viridian Group) was formed in 1998 as a holding company for Northern Ireland Electricity plc, the purpose of the reorganisation was to "step up the move into unregulated markets and for expansion overseas." NIE was a public utility which was privatised in 1993. Formerly a vertically integrated monopoly, NIE's power stations were demerged and sold prior to privatisation.

On 6 October 2006 Viridian's board agreed the acquisition of the group by ElectricInvest, a company owned by the international investment firm Arcapita. The acquisition, which valued Viridian at £1.62 billion, was completed on 8 December 2006.

On  6 July 2010, Viridian agreed to sell Northern Ireland Electricity - including NIE Powerteam, but excluding NIE Energy - to the Electricity Supply Board in the Republic of Ireland. The acquisition was completed in December 2010.

See also
Energy policy of the United Kingdom
Energy policy of the European Union
Energy use and conservation in the United Kingdom
Green electricity in the United Kingdom
Electricity sector in Ireland

References

Electric power companies of Northern Ireland
1998 establishments in Northern Ireland
Energy companies established in 1998